Mamata Banerjee (born 5 January 1955) is an Indian politician who is serving as the eighth and current chief minister of the Indian state of West Bengal since 20 May 2011, the first woman to hold the office. Having served many times as a Union Cabinet Minister, Mamata Banerjee became the Chief Minister of West Bengal for the first time in 2011. She founded the All India Trinamool Congress (AITC or TMC) in 1998 after separating from the Indian National Congress, and became its first chairperson. She is often referred to as 'Didi' (meaning elder sister in Bengali).

Banerjee previously served twice as Minister of Railways, the first woman to do so. She is also the second female Minister of Coal, and Minister of Human Resource Development, Youth Affairs and Sports, Women and Child Development in the cabinet of the Indian government. She rose to prominence after opposing the erstwhile land acquisition policies for industrialisation of the Communist-led government in West Bengal for Special Economic Zones at the cost of agriculturalists and farmers at Singur. In 2011, Banerjee pulled off a landslide victory for the AITC alliance in West Bengal, defeating the 34-year-old Communist Party of India (Marxist)-led Left Front government, the world's longest-serving democratically elected communist-led government, in the process.

She served as the member of West Bengal Legislative Assembly from Bhabanipur from 2011 to 2021. She contested the Nandigram assembly seat and lost to the BJP's Suvendu Adhikari in the 2021 West Bengal Assembly elections, though her party won a large majority of seats. She is the third West Bengal Chief Minister to lose an election from her own constituency, after Prafulla Chandra Sen in 1967 and Buddhadeb Bhattacharjee in 2011. Mamata challenged the result of Nandigram Constituency in Calcutta High Court and the matter is sub judice. She led her party to a landslide victory in the 2021 West Bengal assembly polls. She got elected as member of West Bengal Legislative Assembly again from Bhabanipur constituency in the bypoll.

Early life and education 
Banerjee was born in Calcutta (now Kolkata), West Bengal, to a Bengali Hindu Brahmin family. Her parents were Promileswar Banerjee and Gayetri Devi. Banerjee's father, Promileswar died due to lack of medical treatment, when she was 17. He was a freedom fighter.

In 1970, Banerjee completed the higher secondary board examination from Deshbandhu Sishu Sikshalay. She received a bachelor's degree in history from Jogamaya Devi College. Later, she earned her master's degree in Islamic history from the University of Calcutta. This was followed by a degree in education from Shri Shikshayatan College and a law degree from Jogesh Chandra Chaudhuri Law College, Kolkata.

Banerjee became involved with politics when she was only 15. While studying at the Jogamaya Devi College, she established Chhatra Parishad Unions, the student wing of the Congress (I) Party, defeating the All India Democratic Students Organisation affiliated with the Socialist Unity Centre of India (Communist). She continued in the Congress (I) Party in West Bengal, serving in a variety of positions within the party and in other local political organisations.

Early political career, 1984–2011

Political career with Congress 

Banerjee began her political career in the Congress party as a young woman in the 1970s. In 1975 she gained attention in the press media when she danced on the car of socialist activist and politician Jayaprakash Narayan as a protest against him. She quickly rose in the ranks of the local Congress group and remained the general secretary of Mahila Congress (Indira), West Bengal, from 1976 to 1980. In the 1984 general election, Banerjee became one of India's youngest parliamentarians ever, defeating veteran Communist politician Somnath Chatterjee, to win the Jadavpur parliamentary Constituency in West Bengal. She also became the general secretary of the Indian Youth Congress in 1984. She lost her seat to Malini Bhattacharya of the Communist Party of India (Marxist) in the 1989 general elections in an anti-Congress wave. She was re-elected in the 1991 general elections, having settled into the Calcutta South constituency. She retained the Kolkata South seat in the 1996, 1998, 1999, 2004 and 2009 general elections.

Banerjee was appointed the Union Minister of State for Human Resources Development, Youth Affairs and Sports, and Women and Child Development in 1991 by prime minister, P. V. Narasimha Rao. As the sports minister, she announced that she would resign and protested in a rally at the Brigade Parade Ground in Kolkata, against the Government's indifference towards her proposal to improve sports in the country. She was discharged of her portfolios in 1993. In April 1996, she alleged that Congress was behaving as a stooge of the CPI-M in West Bengal. She said that she was the lone voice of reason and wanted a "clean Congress".

In December 1992, Banerjee took a physically challenged girl, Felani Basak, who was allegedly raped by CPI(M) cadres to Writer's Building to the then Chief Minister Jyoti Basu but was harassed by the police before being arrested and put on detention. She had sworn she would enter the building again only as chief minister.

The State Youth Congress led by Mamata Banerjee organised a protest march to Writers Building in Kolkata on 21 July 1993 against the Communist government of the state. They demanded that voters’ ID cards be made the only required document for voting, to put a stop to CPM's "scientific rigging". Thirteen people were shot and killed by police during the protest and many others were injured. Reacting to this incident the then-Chief Minister of West Bengal, Jyoti Basu, said that the "police had done a good job." During the 2014 inquiry, Justice (retired) Sushanta Chatterjee, former Chief Justice of the Orissa High Court described the police response as "unprovoked and unconstitutional". "The commission has come to the conclusion that the case is even worse than Jallianwala Bagh massacre," said Justice Chatterjee.

Founding Trinamool Congress 

In 1997, due to difference in political views with the then West Bengal Pradesh Congress Committee president Somendra Nath Mitra, Banerjee left the Congress Party in West Bengal and became one of the founding members of the All India Trinamool Congress, along with Mukul Roy. It quickly became the primary opposition party to the long-standing Communist government in the state. On 11 December 1998, she controversially held a Samajwadi Party MP, Daroga Prasad Saroj, by the collar and dragged him out of the well of the Lok Sabha to prevent him from protesting against the Women's Reservation Bill.

Railway Minister (first tenure), 1999–2000 
In 1999, she joined the BJP-led National Democratic Alliance (NDA) government and became Railways Minister. In 2000, Banerjee presented her first Railway Budget. In it, she fulfilled many of her promises to her home state West Bengal. She introduced a new biweekly New Delhi-Sealdah Rajdhani Express train and four express trains connecting various parts of West Bengal, namely the Howrah-Purulia Rupasi Bangla Express, the Sealdah-New Jalpaiguri Padatik Express, the Shalimar-Adra Aranyak Express, the Sealdah-Ajmer Ananya Superfast Express, and Sealdah-Amritsar Akal Takht Superfast Express. She also increased the frequency of the Pune-Howrah Azad Hind Express and extended at least three express train services. Work on the Digha-Howrah Express service was also hastened during her brief tenure.

She also focused on developing tourism, enabling the Darjeeling Himalayan Railway section to obtain two additional locomotives and proposing the Indian Railway Catering and Tourism Corporation Limited. She also commented that India should play a pivotal role in the Trans-Asian Railway and that rail links between Bangladesh and Nepal would be reintroduced. In all, she introduced 19 new trains for the 2000–2001 fiscal year.

In 2000, she and Ajit Kumar Panja resigned to protest the hike in petroleum prices, and then withdrew their resignations without providing any reasons.

2001 West Bengal election 
In early 2001, after Tehelka exposure of Operation West End, Banerjee walked out of the NDA cabinet and allied with the Congress Party for West Bengal's 2001 elections, to protest the corruption charges levelled by the website against senior ministers of the government.

Minister of Coal and Mines, January 2004 – May 2004 

She returned to the NDA government in September 2003 as a cabinet minister without any portfolio. Along with Mamata, her party colleague Sudip Banerjee was also inducted in the Vajpayee ministry. On 9 January 2004 she took charge as Ministry of Coal and Mines. During her short term as the minister of coal and mines, the government disallowed the sale of the National Aluminium Company. She held the Coal and Mines portfolios till 22 May 2004.

2004–2006 election setbacks 
In Indian general election of 2004 her party aligned with the Bharatiya Janata Party, however, the alliance lost the election and she was the only Trinamool Congress member to be elected from a parliamentary seat from West Bengal. Banerjee suffered further setbacks in 2005 when her party lost control of the Kolkata Municipal Corporation and the sitting mayor Subrata Mukherjee defected from her party. In 2006, the Trinamool Congress was defeated in West Bengal's Assembly Elections, losing more than half of its sitting members.
On 4 August 2006, Banerjee hurled her resignation papers at the deputy speaker Charanjit Singh Atwal in Lok Sabha. She was provoked by Speaker Somnath Chatterjee's rejection of her adjournment motion on illegal infiltration by Bangladeshis in West Bengal on the grounds that it was not in the proper format.

Singur, Nandigram and other movements 
On 20 October 2005, she protested against the forceful land acquisition and the atrocities perpetrated against local farmers in the name of the industrial development policy of the Buddhadeb Bhattacharjee government in West Bengal. Benny Santoso, CEO of the Indonesia-based Salim Group, had pledged a large investment in West Bengal, and the West Bengal government had given him farmland in Howrah, sparking protests. In soaking rain, Banerjee and other Trinamool Congress members stood in front of the Taj Hotel where Santoso had arrived, shut out by the police. Later, she and her supporters followed Santoso's convoy. A planned "black flag" protest was avoided when the government had Santoso arrive three hours ahead of schedule.

Singur protest 

In November 2006, Banerjee was forcibly stopped on her way to Singur for a rally against a proposed Tata Motors car project. Banerjee reached the West Bengal assembly and protested at the venue. She addressed a press conference at the assembly and announced a 12-hour shutdown by her party on Friday. The TMC supremo Mamata, who was arrested by police earlier in that day 'for violating prohibitory orders' near Singur, alleged that the administration had acted ‘unconstitutionally’ by preventing her from entering Singur where the Tata motors proposed to set up a small car factory. She was intercepted at Hooghly and sent back. After this incident the Trinamool Congress MLAs protested by damaging furniture and microphones and vandalizing the West Bengal Legislative Assembly Building. A major strike was called on 14 December 2006. But all-in-all, there was no gain. On 4 December, Banerjee began the historic 26-day hunger strike in Kolkata protesting the forcible acquisition of farmland by the government. The then-President A. P. J. Abdul Kalam, who was concerned about her health, spoke to the then-Prime Minister Manmohan Singh to resolve the issue. Kalam also appealed to Ms Banerjee to withdraw her fast as "life is precious". A letter from Manmohan Singh was faxed to Gopalkrishna Gandhi, the then-Governor of West Bengal, and then it was immediately delivered to Mamata. After receiving the letter Mamata finally broke her fast at midnight on 29 December. (One of her first acts after becoming Chief Minister was to return the 400 acres of land to Singur farmers. In 2016 the Supreme Court declared that the acquisition of 997 acres of land by West Bengal's Left Front government for the Tata Motors plant in Singur was illegal.)

Nandigram protest 

The Nandigram violence was an incident of Nandigram in West Bengal, occurred in the year 2007, where a battalion of armed police stormed the rural area in the district of Purba Medinipur with the aim of quashing protests against the West Bengal government's plans to expropriate  of land for a Special Economic Zone (SEZ) to be developed by the Indonesian-based Salim Group. At least 14 villagers were shot dead and 70 more were wounded. This led to a large number of intellectuals to protest on the streets. CPI(M) cadres allegedly molested and raped 300 women and girls during the Nandigram invasions.

Banerjee wrote letters to Indian Prime Minister Manmohan Singh and Union Home Minister Shivraj Patil to stop what she called "state-sponsored violence" promoted by CPI(M) in Nandigram. Her political activism during the movement is widely believed to be one of the contributing causes to her landslide victory in 2011.

The CBI report on the incident vindicated CPI(M)'s stand that Buddhadeb did not order the police to open fire. They did so only to disperse the unlawful assembly after every other standard operating procedure had failed. But supporting the violence in Nandigram by his own party workers, Buddhadeb Bhattacharya had said earlier "They (the oppositions) have been paid back in the same coin." There are allegations of involvement of some local TMC leaders in the Nandigram Violence (On 15 April Ms. Banerjee clarified this matter in a live interview to ABP Ananda).

2009–2011 electoral progress 
Before the 2009 parliamentary elections she allied with the United Progressive Alliance (UPA) led by Indian National Congress. The alliance won 26 seats. Banerjee joined the central cabinet as the railway minister (second tenure). In the 2010 Municipal Elections in West Bengal, TMC won Kolkata Municipal Corporation by a margin of 62 seats. TMC also won Bidhan Nagar Corporation by a seven-seat margin. In 2011, Banerjee won a sweeping majority and assumed the position of chief minister of the state of West Bengal. Her party ended the 34-year rule of the Left Front.

Trinamool Congress performed well in the 2009 parliamentary election, winning 19 seats. Its allies in Congress and SUCI also won six and one seats respectively marking the best performance by any opposition party in West Bengal since the beginning of the Left's regime. Until then, the Congress victory of 16 seats in 1984, was considered their best show in opposition.

Railway Minister (second tenure), 2009–2011 
In 2009, Mamata Banerjee became the railway minister for the second time. Her focus was again on West Bengal.

She led Indian Railways to introduce a number of non-stop Duronto Express trains connecting large cities as well as a number of other passenger trains, including women-only trains. The Anantnag-Qadigund segment of the Jammu–Baramulla line that had been in the making since 1994 was inaugurated during her tenure.

She stepped down as railway minister to become the chief minister of West Bengal. She commented: "The way I am leaving the railways behind, it will run well. Don’t worry, my successor will get all my support." Her nominee from her party, Dinesh Trivedi, succeeded her as railway minister.

Banerjee's tenure as railway minister was subsequently questioned as most of the big-ticket announcements made by her when she held the post, saw little or no progress. Reuters reported that "Her two-year record as railway minister has been heavily criticized for running the network into more debt to pay for populist measures such as more passenger trains." The Indian Railways became loss-making during her two-year tenure.

Chief Minister of West Bengal

First term, 2011–16 

In 2011, the All India Trinamool Congress along with SUCI and the INC won the West Bengal legislative assembly election against the incumbent Left Alliance by securing 227 seats. TMC won 184 seats with the INC winning 42 seats and the SUCI secured one seat. This marked the end of the longest-ruling democratically elected Communist party in the world.

Banerjee was sworn in as chief minister of West Bengal on 20 May 2011. As the first female chief minister of West Bengal, one of her first decisions was to return 400 acres of land to Singur farmers. "The cabinet has decided to return 400 acres to unwilling farmers in Singur," the chief minister said. "I have instructed the department to prepare the papers for this. If Tata-babu (Ratan Tata) wants, he can set up his factory on the remaining 600 acres, otherwise we will see how to go about it."

She has also been credited for setting up of the Gorkhaland Territorial Administration.

She began various reforms in the education and health sectors. Some of the reforms in the education sector included the release of teachers' monthly pay on the first of every month and quicker pensions for retiring teachers. In the health sector Banerjee promised: "A three-phase developmental system will be taken up to improve the health infrastructure and service." On 30 April 2015, a representative of UNICEF India congratulated the government for making Nadia the first Open Defecation Free district in the country. In a statement on 17 October 2012, Banerjee attributed the increasing incidence of rape in the country to "more free interaction between men and women". She said that "Earlier if men and women would hold hands, they would get caught by parents and reprimanded but now everything is so open. It’s like an open market with open options." She was criticised in the national media for these statements.

She was also instrumental in the rollback of the petrol price hikes and the suspension of FDI in the retail sector until a consensus is evolved. In a bid to improve the law and enforcement situation in West Bengal, police commissioners were created at Howrah, Barrackpore, Durgapur-Asansol and Bidhannagar. The total area of Kolkata Municipal Corporation was brought under the control of the Kolkata Police.

Banerjee had shown a keen interest in making the public aware of the state's history and culture. She named several stations of the Kolkata Metro after freedom fighters, and plans on naming upcoming stations after religious leaders, poets, singers and the like. Mamata Banerjee has been criticised for starting controversial stipends to imams (Iman Bhatta) which was ruled unconstitutional by Calcutta High Court.

On 16 February 2012, Bill Gates, of the Bill & Melinda Gates Foundation, sent a letter to the West Bengal government praising Banerjee and her administration for achieving a full year without any reported cases of polio. The letter said this was not only a milestone for India but also for the whole world.

In June 2012, she launched a Facebook page to rally and gather public support for A.P.J Abdul Kalam, her party's choice for the presidential elections. After he refused to stand for the second time, she supported Pranab Mukherjee for the post, after a long tussle over the issue, commenting she was personally a "great fan" of Mukherjee and wishing that he "grows from strength to strength".

She is against calling bandhs (work stoppage) although actively supported them when she was in opposition.

Her tenure was also heavily marred by the Saradha Scam – financial embezzlement which led to the imprisonment of Madan Mitra – a former minister in her cabinet, Kunal Ghosh – a party MP, and rigorous grilling of several party men holding important posts.

Second term, 2016–2021 

In the 2016 assembly elections, All India Trinamool Congress won with a landslide two-thirds majority under Mamata Banerjee winning 211 seats out of total 293, who has been elected as Chief Minister West Bengal for the second term. All India Trinamool Congress won with an enhanced majority contesting alone and became the first ruling party to win without an ally since 1962 in West Bengal.

In 2017 Kanyashree, a scheme launched by her government, was ranked the best by the United Nations among 552 social sector schemes from across 62 countries.

Third term, 2021–present 

In the 2021 assembly elections, AITC won with a landslide two-thirds majority. But, Mamata Banerjee who fought from Nandigram lost against Suvendu Adhikari of Bharatiya Janata Party by 1,956 votes. Mamata Banerjee however challenged this outcome and the matter is sub judice. As her party won 213 seats out of total 292, she was elected as Chief Minister of West Bengal for the third term. Later at Raj Bhawan, she tendered her resignation to Jagdeep Dhankhar. She took oath as Chief Minister on 5 May 2021. Her party later won 2 remaining seats and she herself won Bhabanipur by-election by a huge margin of 58,835 votes. She was sworn in as MLA on 7 October.

After winning the election, following her promises she launched the scheme Lakshmir Bhandar . In this scheme women under the age of 60 were provided the basic financial help, about 500 rupees for general and 1000 rupees to minorities. The scheme turned out to be a huge success as it became massively popular.

Another scheme was also projected under her leadership, Students Credit Card scheme, to give financial supports in loan to intellectual students who are unable to keep higher studies due to lack of money. The loan limit was upto 10 lakh rupees, under the nominee of government of West Bengal.

On 30 November 2021, she surpassed her immediate predecessor Buddhadeb Bhattacharjee to become the third-longest-serving Chief Minister of West Bengal. If Mamata remains in office on and beyond 26 October 2025, she will become the second-longest-serving Chief Minister after Jyoti Basu, superseding Bidhan Chandra Roy.

Public profile and controversies

Saradha scam 

The Saradha Group financial scandal and the Rose Valley financial scandal came to light during her tenure and some of her cabinet ministers were accused of money laundering and have been incarcerated. She has been criticised by opposition parties for not taking adequate steps against her own ministers who tried to cover-up their deeds. Sudipto Sen was arrested from Kashmir. The Shyamal Sen Commission, set up by the Chief Minister, was able to return  to the depositors. Leaders from Congress and CPI(M) like Adhir Ranjan Chowdhury, Sujan Chakraborty, Biman Bose were also accused in this scam. Despite Bankshall Court's order to investigate into this matter, no action has been taken by CBI against any of these leaders (other than TMC leaders) to date.

Rose Valley scam 

The Rose Valley financial scandal was a major financial scam and alleged political scandal in India caused by the collapse of a Ponzi scheme run by Rose Valley Group where multiple MPs from Banerjee's party were accused of money laundering.

Narada scam 

The Narada sting operation was carried out by Mathew Samuel in 2011 for the Indian newsmagazine Tehelka and published on Naradanews.com just before the 2016 West Bengal Assembly elections. The sting targeted high-ranking officials and politicians of Banerjee's political party All India Trinamool Congress (AITC).

During her tenure she challenged the federal system of India when she ordered the arrest of CBI officials, who arrived in Kolkata to investigate the Saradha Group financial scandal. But CBI's attempted arrest of Kolkata Police Commissioner was also an attack on federalism.

Allegations of Muslim appeasement 
Mamata Banerjee and her government has been accused of "Muslim appeasement" several times by different groups of people including the opposition political parties. But refuting such claims her supporters says "Didi works for everyone, doesn’t discriminate between Hindus and Muslims."

Imam Bhatta controversy 
Mamata Banerjee has been criticised for starting controversial stipends to imams (Iman Bhatta). The stipends were ruled unconstitutional by Calcutta High Court and ordered the West Bengal government to stop payment of the monthly stipend to thousands of imams and muezzins in the state.

Durga Idol immersion controversy 
In October 2016, the West Bengal government banned the Durga Puja festival immersion after 4:00 pm. Durga Puja was to take place on 12 October and Muharram on 13 October. This was seen by a section of the West Bengal population as another example of the "Muslim Appeasement" policy of Banerjee's government. The Calcutta High Court overturned the decision and called it "a bid to appease minorities".

Suppressed campus democracy and youth agitations 
Mamata Banerjee denied permission for Anti-CAA rallies and suppressed campus democracy in West Bengal. The West Bengal police denied permission to Aishe Ghosh to hold a rally at Durgapur in Bengal's West Burdwan district saying chief minister Mamata Banerjee was holding a roadshow at the same spot. "A huge crowd had assembled for the chief minister’s rally. Another rally at the same spot would have led to chaos," an officer from Durgapur police station said.

COVID-19 management 

Banerjee and her government was widely criticised of the handling of the COVID-19 pandemic and was accused of concealing facts by the opposition, critics and many doctors.

The opposition accused Mamata of playing "appeasement politics" amid the COVID-19 crisis. On 1 April, Banerjee claimed that the West Bengal Government have already traced 54 people who attended the Tablighi Jamaat religious gathering during the COVID-19 Outbreak, and 44 of them are foreigners. Although according to a report by central security agencies, 232 people had attended Delhi's Tablighi Jamaat event from West Bengal. Of this, 123 are Indian nationals and 109 are foreigners.

The West Bengal Government has been also criticized for not sending enough samples to the National Institute of Cholera and Enteric Diseases (NICED) for testing. The government later banned use of cellphones in hospitals.

However, Mamata Banerjee blamed BJP's IT cell for "using fake news to malign West Bengal’s health department". Many people were arrested for spreading fake news amid lockdown. FIR was lodged against a Bengal BJP MP also for raising "false alarm" over COVID-19 deaths in Bengal.

Personal life and recognitions 
Throughout her political life, Banerjee has maintained a publicly austere lifestyle, dressing in simple traditional Bengali clothes and avoiding luxuries.

During an interview in April 2019, Prime minister Narendra Modi claimed that despite their political differences, Banerjee sends her own selected kurtas and sweets to him every year (When Ms. Banerjee was asked about this in an interview, she said "We send all the good things of Bengal not only to him, but also to others belonging to different political parties." Australian Envoy Barry O'Farrell thanked her for sending sweets on the occasion of Vijayadashami). In September 2019 when Ms. Jashodaben, the wife of PM Modi, was leaving Kolkata, Mamata met her at the Kolkata airport and gifted her a saree.

She identifies herself as a Hindu.

Banerjee is a self-taught painter and a poet. Her 300 paintings were sold for ₹9crore (₹90 million, £990,000 or US$1,350,000).

In 2012, Time magazine named her as one of the 100 Most Influential People in the World. Bloomberg Markets magazine listed her among the 50 most influential people in the world of finance in September 2012. In 2018, she was conferred the Skoch Chief Minister of the Year Award.

Banerjee stepped out into the streets of Kolkata during lockdown, caused by the COVID-19 outbreak, to spread awareness among the common people.

"She has always been a fighter" said Yashwant Sinha while disclosing that Mamata had offered to be a hostage as part of a negotiation strategy during the Kandahar hijacking crisis. "She was ready to make the ultimate sacrifice for the country" Sinha added.

While appealing for maintaining religious harmony, Banerjee has reiterated the fact on numerous occasions that "Religion is personal, but festivals are universal."

In 2021, Mamata Banerjee was invited to attend World Meeting for Peace in Rome. She was the only Indian invited to attend the event. But in September, the Union Ministry of External Affairs (MEA) denied her permission to attend the peace conference stating that the event was not "commensurate in status for participation by the chief minister of a state". BJP MP Subramanian Swamy slammed Modi government on Banerjee's Rome visit cancelation. According to Indian Diplomat K. P. Fabian, the reason cited by MEA was unconvincing. Similarly, in December, Banerjee was denied permission by the MEA to visit Nepal.

TIME magazine published its annual list of 'The 100 Most Influential People of 2021' on 15 September 2021. The list includes Mamata Banerjee among others.

She received an honorary doctorate from the Kalinga Institute of Industrial Technology, Bhubaneswar. She was also honoured with a Doctorate of Literature (D.Litt.) degree by Calcutta University.

In popular culture 
Baghini, a Bengali film, inspired by Mamata Banerjee's life, was released on 24 May 2019. It is not a biopic.

Works in literature and other fields 

Numerous books written by her have been published so far. On 2022, she was given Paschimbanga Akademy Award for 'Kabita Bitan' which consists of 946 poems.

She is also a self-taught painter. Her paintings are auctioned several times.

She is also a lyricist and her compositions are mostly based on 'Durga Puja' and 'Motherland'. 'Maa Go Tumi Sarbojanin' sung by Shreya Ghoshal is one of her most popular songs.

See also 
 Ma Mati Manush

Notelist

References

Further reading 
Books

Journals

External links 
 
 
 
 Official website (Chief Minister's office)
 Official page on Trinamool Congress Party's website
 Profile at BBC News

 
1955 births
Living people
Indian political party founders
Bengali Hindus
Politicians from Kolkata
Jogamaya Devi College alumni
Jogesh Chandra Chaudhuri Law College alumni
Shri Shikshayatan College alumni
University of Calcutta alumni
India MPs 2004–2009
India MPs 2009–2014
Members of the Cabinet of India
Railway Ministers of India
Coal Ministers of India
Trinamool Congress politicians from West Bengal
Chief Ministers of West Bengal
India MPs 1991–1996
India MPs 1996–1997
India MPs 1998–1999
India MPs 1999–2004
Indian anti-communists
Lok Sabha members from West Bengal
Women members of the Cabinet of India
Women chief ministers of Indian states
Women members of the West Bengal Legislative Assembly
Indian women painters
20th-century Indian women politicians
20th-century Indian politicians
21st-century Indian women politicians
21st-century Indian politicians
Women members of the Lok Sabha
India MPs 1984–1989
Hindu poets
Women artists from West Bengal
Painters from West Bengal
21st-century Indian women artists
West Bengal MLAs 2011–2016
West Bengal MLAs 2016–2021
West Bengal MLAs 2021–2026